The Leon M. Goldstein High School for the Sciences at Kingsborough Community College, CUNY, formerly Kingsborough High School for the Sciences at Kingsborough Community College, CUNY from 1993 to 1999) is a four-year high school (grades 9-12), located in Manhattan Beach, Brooklyn, New York. Leon M. Goldstein High School is screened-admission public school under the administration of the New York City Department of Education.

LMGHS is located on the northern part of the campus of Kingsborough Community College of the City University of New York; it overlooks Sheepshead Bay. LMGHS was opened in September 1993 by Mayor David Dinkins and President of Kingsborough Community College Leon M. Goldstein. Goldstein supported the idea for starting a high school at Kingsborough Community College and the high school was later renamed in Goldstein's honor. The high school's first class graduated in June 1997.

The high school has a partnership with Kingsborough Community College, and is able to use many of its facilities including the gymnasium, auditorium, and some laboratories. Like many high schools in New York City, LMGHS offers College Now programs and a Bridge Program, enabling high school students to take some college courses and earn college credits from CUNY.

Demographics
The school has approximately 1,000 students, making it smaller than most other NYC public high schools.

As of the 2020/2021 school year, the school has a 57% female, 43% male gender balance. The racial makeup of the school is approximately 9% of the student body are Black, 10% are Hispanic,  26% are Asian, 52% are white, and 3%  identify as multiracial. 52% of  the student body is classified as economically disadvantaged with 1% of the student body also classified as homeless.

Requirements for graduation

In order to qualify for a diploma, students must complete four years of English, science, social studies, mathematics, physical education, and elective classes; a total of 44 credits are required for graduation. In addition, students are required to complete at least one year of foreign language; one credit each of music and art are also required. These requirements are the same as most other NYC public high schools.

A New York State Regents Diploma is given to students who pass the Regents Examinations in English, global history, American history, algebra, geometry, advanced algebra, trigonometry, biology, chemistry, and physics and who complete three years of a foreign language. Students who have completed a minimum of nine semesters (9 credits) of arts study, along with a rigorous assessment of their art form, including passing the visual arts or music Regents Examination, will also earn the NYC Chancellor's Arts Endorsed Diploma.

Technology
All classrooms in Goldstein are also equipped with Smart Boards, consistent with most other high schools in New York City. Teachers in Goldstein use the school's website to post homework, but also use other websites such as blogs for posting homework and other assignments. LMG also offers to all students the opportunity to join a completely student run technology service organization and programming club  which assists school administration and staff in maintaining/repairing computer equipment; students, in addition, regularly aid in the maintenance of school information systems and other IT infrastructure. 

In 2015, LMGHS computer science students were given the opportunity to partner with Young and Rubicam in a joint technology venture to expose students to a business setting and allow them to apply their knowledge of computer science/digital graphics design .

AP courses
Leon M. Goldstein High School allows students to take a variety of Advanced Placement classes. The AP classes that are currently taught at LMG are AP Chemistry, AP Computer Science A, AP Computer Science Principles, AP Art History, AP Music Theory, AP Physics 1, AP Physics 2, AP English Language and Composition, AP English Literature and Composition, AP Spanish Language, AP Psychology, AP World History, AP Human Geography, AP United States History, AP Biology, AP Microeconomics, AP Macroeconomics, AP United States Government, AP Calculus AB, AP Calculus BC, and AP Statistics. Students in the elective photography, painting, and ceramics classes can take the AP Studio Art exams.

Electives
There are a number of elective courses including journalism, drama, music, and law. LMGHS is rare among New York City high schools in that it has a functioning photographic dark room.

Arts
In addition to the SING! program, Goldstein produces other theatrical performances throughout the year, showcasing students from the drama, chorus, and music classes. 

An annual exhibition of student artwork is displayed in the art gallery of Kingsborough Community College every January; the gallery exhibition opening incorporates talks by the art and music students along with performances of the LMG student Jazz Ensemble and Chamber Chorus. 

The school has a small art collection, including the painting "Freedom of Artistic Expression" by Frank Herbert Mason, the sculpture "Genius" by Ralph Helmick and Stu Schechter, as well as paintings, sculptures and photography by former students. 

Students at LMGHS have earned the NYC Chancellor's Arts Endorsed Diploma.

Sports
Unlike many high schools in the united states, Leon M. Goldstein High School does not have a football team or football field. This, however, is typical of many new york city high schools. 

Varsity sports teams include the basketball team, swimming team, bowling team, soccer team, wrestling team, tennis team, girls volleyball team, handball team, and golf team. LMG also has an active cheerleading squad called the "Boosters". The sports teams are called the LMG "Dolphins"

Clubs and activities

Student government and School Leadership Team

LMGHS has an active student government, which is elected every May. The school maintains positions for president, vice-president, secretary, treasurer, and student representatives from each grade. There is also a Senior Council composed of a president, vice-president, secretary, treasurer, and two cabinet members.

SING!

SING! is held annually at LMGHS. It is a competitive musical theater production pairing the Seniors and Freshmen versus the Juniors and Sophomores. SING! is student run and consists of writing, song, dance, acting, costume design, and stage design, etc.

Clubs
Goldstein has scheduled a "Club Hour" on Wednesday afternoons for the various student clubs to meet. Currently there are over 50 registered clubs at LMGHS including: Programming Club, Robotics Club, Basketball Club, Art Club, Science Olympiad Club-Team, Fashion Club, Technical Theater/Scenic Design/Stage Crew, Yearbook Staff, School Newspaper Staff, Computer Tech Squad, Environmental Club, Fishing Club, Hispanic Heritage Club, Italian-American Heritage Club,  Muslim Heritage Club, Jewish Heritage Club, Chess Club, Book Club, Red Cross Club, Film Club, and Medical Club.

National organizations

LMGHS students are members in several important national organizations such as Key Club and a Chapter of People to People International. Both of these clubs award community service credits to members who participate in club activities, and often involve the entire student body and school community through their activities. There is a chapter of the National Math Honor Society Mu Alpha Theta which involves students who are highly proficient in mathematics. Goldstein also has Arista and Archon chapters of the National Honor Society; student membership in the Arista/Archon chapters is awarded for exemplary work in community service and academic achievement. In addition, students can join a variety of other honor societies including Rho Kappa, Sigma Tau Delta, and the Tri-M Music Honor Society.

Notable alumni
 Phillipe Nover

References

External links

Manhattan Beach, Brooklyn
Educational institutions established in 1993
Public high schools in Brooklyn
1993 establishments in New York City